The 1957 Arizona State–Flagstaff Lumberjacks football team was an American football team that represented Arizona State College at Flagstaff (now known as Northern Arizona University) in the Frontier Conference during the 1957 NAIA football season. In their second year under head coach Max Spilsbury, the Lumberjacks compiled an 8–1 record (3–0 against conference opponents), won the Frontier Conference championship, and outscored opponents by a total of 269 to 65.

The team played its home games at the newly-constructed Skidmore Stadium (later renamed Lumberjack Stadium) in Flagstaff, Arizona.  The season opener against Fort Huachuca was the first game played in Skidmore Stadium.

Schedule

References

Arizona State-Flagstaff
Northern Arizona Lumberjacks football seasons
Arizona State-Flagstaff Lumberjacks football